Seaman Asahel Knapp (December 16, 1833 – April 1, 1911) was a Union College graduate, Phi Beta Kappa member, physician, college instructor, and, later, administrator, who took up farming late in life, moving to Iowa to raise general crops and livestock.

The first seeds of what would later become an abiding interest in farm demonstration were planted after he became active in an organization called "The Teachers of Agriculture," attending their meetings at the Michigan Agricultural College in 1881 and the Iowa Agricultural College in 1882. Knapp was so impressed with this teaching method that he drafted a bill for the establishment of experimental research stations, which later was introduced to the 47th Congress, laying the foundation for a nationwide network of agricultural experiment stations.

Knapp later served as the second president of Iowa Agricultural College — the future Iowa State University — from 1883 to 1884, but his interest in agricultural demonstration work did not occur until 1886, when he moved to Louisiana and began developing a large tract of agricultural land in the western part of this state. He founded Vinton, Louisiana, naming the town after his hometown Vinton, Iowa.
Knapp could neither persuade local farmers to adopt the techniques he had perfected on his farm nor enlist farmers from the North to move to the region to serve collectively as a sort of educational catalyst. What he could do, he reasoned, was to provide incentives for farmers to settle in each township with the proviso that each, in turn, would demonstrate to other farmers what could be done by adopting his improved farming methods. The concept worked. Northern farmers began moving into the region, and native farmers began buying into Knapp's methods. By 1902, Knapp was employed by the government to promote good agricultural practices in the South.

Based on his own experience, Knapp was convinced that demonstrations carried out by farmers themselves were the most effective way to disseminate good farming methods. His efforts were aided by the onslaught of the boll weevil, a voracious cotton pest whose presence was felt not only in Louisiana but also throughout much of the South. Damage associated with this pest instilled fear among many merchants and growers that the cotton economy would disintegrate around them.

In the view of many, a farm demonstration at the Walter G. Porter farm, now a National Historic Landmark in Terrell, Texas, set up by the Department of Agriculture at the urging of concerned merchants and growers, was the first in a series of steps that eventually led to passage of the legislation that formalize Cooperative Extension work.

USDA officials were so impressed with the success of this demonstration that they appropriated $250,000 to combat the weevil—a measure that also involved the hiring of farm demonstration agents. By 1904, some 20 agents were employed in Texas, Louisiana and Arkansas. The movement also appeared to be spreading to neighboring Mississippi and Alabama.

Knapp is commemorated in Washington, D.C. by a bridge linking the U.S. Department of Agriculture Administration Building to the U.S. Department of Agriculture South Building across Independence Avenue.

Death and legacy
Seaman A. Knapp died in 1911, aged 77, and is interred at Iowa State University Cemetery, Ames, Iowa. His son, Bradford Knapp, was the President of the Alabama Polytechnic Institute, now known as Auburn University from 1928 to 1933 and the second president of Texas Tech University in Lubbock, Texas.

See also
Kenyon L. Butterfield

References

External links

American agronomists
Alabama Cooperative Extension System
1831 births
1911 deaths
Union College (New York) alumni
Presidents of Iowa State University
People from Vinton, Iowa
People from Vinton, Louisiana
People from Essex County, New York
Scientists from New York (state)
20th-century American scientists
20th-century earth scientists